The 1871 season was the first season of the Boston Red Stockings franchise, now known as the Atlanta Braves. They were formed in 1871 by Boston businessman and Ashburnham native Ivers Whitney Adams. The team was composed of former players of the defunct Cincinnati Red Stockings franchise, who were brought to Boston and kept the name with them. Led and managed by baseball pioneer Harry Wright, the new Boston team would join the newly formed National Association of Professional Base Ball Players for the 1871 season and finish the year in third place with a record of 20–10.

Pitcher Al Spalding started all 31 of the Red Stockings' games and led the NA with 19 wins. Catcher Cal McVey finished second in the league batting race with a .431 average. From this team, Harry Wright, Al Spalding, and shortstop George Wright have all been elected into the Baseball Hall of Fame.

Regular season

Season standings

Record vs. opponents

Roster

Player stats

Batting

Starters by position 
Note: Pos = Position; G = Games played; AB = At bats; H = Hits; Avg. = Batting average; HR = Home runs; RBI = Runs batted in

Other batters 
Note: G = Games played; AB = At bats; H = Hits; Avg. = Batting average; HR = Home runs; RBI = Runs batted in

Pitching

Starting pitchers 
Note: G = Games pitched; IP = Innings pitched; W = Wins; L = Losses; ERA = Earned run average; SO = Strikeouts

Relief pitchers 
Note: G = Games pitched; IP = Innings pitched; W = Wins; L = Losses; ERA = Earned run average; SO = Strikeouts

References 

1871 Boston Red Stockings season at Baseball Reference

Boston Red Stockings seasons
Boston Red Stockings
Boston Red Stockings
19th century in Boston